During the 1953–54 English football season, Arsenal F.C. competed in the Football League First Division.

Season summary

Final league table

Results
Arsenal's score comes first

Legend

FA Charity Shield

Arsenal entered the FA Charity Shield as 1952-53 League champions, in which they faced FA Cup winners Blackpool.

Football League First Division

FA Cup

Squad

References

Arsenal F.C. seasons
Arsenal